Bill Morrison (born 1959) is an American comic book artist, writer, and editor. He is a co-founder of Bongo Comics (along with Matt Groening and Steve and Cindy Vance).

Early life
Morrison is a native of Lincoln Park, Michigan, a Downriver suburb of Detroit. He attended the College for Creative Studies.

Career
At the beginning of his career in the early 1980s, Morrison worked as a technical illustrator for Artech, Inc. (Livonia, Michigan) before going to work as an illustrator for Disney, where he created promotional art for:
 Lady and the Tramp
 Cinderella
 Bambi
 Peter Pan
 The Jungle Book
 Robin Hood
 The Rescuers
 The Fox and the Hound
 Oliver & Company
 The Little Mermaid (including a controversial image)
 “Roller Coaster Rabbit”
 “The Prince and the Pauper”
 The Rescuers Down Under

Subsequently, he worked as an illustrator and occasional writer for The Simpsons and created his own comic Roswell. He also served as a director for Futurama.

Morrison was the creative director of Bongo Comics from 1993 to 2012.

In 1998, Morrison illustrated (although it was signed by Matt Groening) the cover artwork of The Simpsons' The Yellow Album. His cover was a parody of the cover art for the Beatles album Sgt. Pepper's Lonely Hearts Club Band, replaced with characters from The Simpsons. In 2005, the artist and designer Kaws (commissioned by Nigo) created The Kaws Album, a "traced interpretation" of The Yellow Album. In 2019, Sotheby's auction house in Hong Kong sold The Kaws Album for 115.9 million Hong Kong dollars, or about $14.7 million U.S. dollars, a new auction record for the artist at the time. Morrison felt "ripped off" by this, re-igniting a conversation about the appropriation of commercial illustrations for fine art (see Roy Lichtenstein).

Morrison is an Eagle Scout in the Boy Scouts of America (BSA); he created the mural A Century of Values to celebrate the BSA centennial in 2010.

On the occasion of the fiftieth anniversary of Yellow Submarine, The Beatles' 1968 animated feature film, Titan Comics published, on August 28, 2018, a hardcover comicbook illustrated by Morrisson.

He was the executive editor of MAD magazine from early 2018 (beginning with the rebooted issue #1 dated June 2018) to March 2019.

References

External links

comiXology.com's podcast with Bill Morrison and Scott Shaw on the Captain Carrot and the Final Ark limited series

1959 births
Living people
People from Lincoln Park, Michigan
College for Creative Studies alumni
Mad (magazine) people
Inkpot Award winners